Miroslava is a 1993 Mexican drama film directed by Alejandro Pelayo and starring Arielle Dombasle, Claudio Brook and Milosh Trnka. The film portrays the life of the Czech-born actress Miroslava, who became one of the biggest stars in Mexico before her suicide in 1955.

Partial cast

 Arielle Dombasle as Adult Miroslava  
 Claudio Brook as Alex Fimman 
 Milosh Trnka as Dr. Oscar Stern 
 Arleta Jeziorska as Young Miroslava 
 Evangelina Martinez as Rosario 
 Pamela Sniezhkin Brook as Child Miroslava 
 Verónica Langer as Miroslava's Mother 
 Rosa María Bianchi as Sofía 
 Josefo Rodríguez as Luis Miguel Dominguín 
 Alicia Laguna as Graciela 
 Demián Bichir as Ricardo 
 Miguel Pizarro as Jesús Jaime 
 Brígida Alexander as Miroslava's Grandmother 
 Juan Carlos Colombo as Dr. Pascual Roncal 
 Eugenia Leñero as Eugenia 
 Raúl Izaguirre as Ernesto Alonso 
 Esteban Plácido Mealaza as Luis Buñuel

References

Bibliography 
 Montes Garcés, Elizabeth. Relocating Identities in Latin American Cultures.  University of Calgary Press, 2007.

External links 
 

1993 films
Mexican biographical drama films
1990s biographical drama films
1990s Spanish-language films
Films set in the 1940s
Films set in the 1950s
Films about filmmaking
1993 drama films
1990s Mexican films